Los versos del capitán is a book by the Chilean poet Pablo Neruda, winner of the Nobel Prize in Literature in 1971. It was published for the first time anonymously in Italy in 1952 by his friend Paolo Ricci. The book with his own name in it was first published in Chile, in 1963, with a note written by Neruda explaining why he used anonymity.
It is considered that "Los versos del capitan" were dedicated to Neruda's lover Matilde Urrutia, whom he married a few years later.

Structure

The book is divided into five groups of short poems and ends with two longer poems, entitled "Epitalamio" and "La carta en el camino."

 El amor
 En ti la tierra
 La reina
 El alfarero
 8 de septiembre
 Tus pies
 Tus manos
 Tu risa
 El inconstante
 La noche en la isla
 El viento en la isla
 La infinita
 Bella
 La rama robada
 El hijo
 La tierra
 Ausencia

 El deseo
 El tigre
 El cóndor
 El insecto
 Las furias
 El amor
 Siempre
 El desvío
 La pregunta
 La pródiga
 El daño
 El pozo
 El sueño
 Si tú me olvidas
 El olvido
 Las muchachas
 Tú venías

 Las vidas
 El monto y el río
 La pobreza
 Las vidas
 La bandera
 El amor del soldado
 No sólo el fuego
 La muerta
 Pequeña América
 Oda y germinaciones
 I
 II
 III
 IV
 V
 VI
 Epitalamio
 La carta en el camino

References

 

1952 books
1952 poems
Chilean poetry collections
Pablo Neruda